Tsewang Namgyal was a 16th-century Namgyal dynasty king (gyalpo) of Ladakh, India, from 1575 to 1595. He was succeeded by his son, Namgyal Gonpo.

References

16th-century monarchs in Asia
Kings of Ladakh